The Death of Doctor Island is a science fiction novella by American writer Gene Wolfe  first published as The Death of Dr. Island in Universe 3 (Editor Terry Carr, Random House, 1973). It won the 1973 Nebula Award for Best Novella. It was nominated for the 1974 Hugo Award for Best Novella, and placed first in the 1974 Locus Poll Award for Best Novella.

References

External links

See also
 The Island of Doctor Death and Other Stories and Other Stories

1973 short stories  
Nebula Award for Best Novella-winning works 
Science fiction short stories
Short stories by Gene Wolfe
Random House books